"Biogenesis" is the twenty-second episode and the sixth season finale of the science fiction television series The X-Files. The episode first aired in the United States and Canada on May 16, 1999, on the Fox Network, and aired in the United Kingdom and Ireland on July 25, 1999, on Sky1. It was written by executive producers Chris Carter and Frank Spotnitz, and directed by Rob Bowman. "Biogenesis" earned a Nielsen household rating of 9.4, being watched by 15.86 million people in its initial broadcast. The episode received mixed reviews from critics.

The show centers on FBI special agents Fox Mulder (David Duchovny) and Dana Scully (Gillian Anderson) who work on cases linked to the paranormal, called X-Files. Mulder is a believer in the paranormal, while the skeptical Scully has been assigned to debunk his work. In the episode, Mulder and Scully investigate a bizarre rock inscribed with Navajo writing found in Côte d'Ivoire, and the death of the African scientist involved. While its appearance in Washington begins to affect Mulder's mental health, leading him to turn to Agent Fowley for help; a disturbed Scully—determined to disprove the theory that life on Earth began with aliens—heads to New Mexico and finds a dying Albert Hosteen—who has discovered that the rock includes passages from the Bible, and a map of the human genome. While Mulder breaks down in a mental institution, Scully journeys unexpectedly to Africa.

"Biogenesis" was a story milestone for the series, along with "The Sixth Extinction" and "The Sixth Extinction II: Amor Fati," and introduced new aspects to the series' overarching mythology. The episode was written due to series creator Chris Carter's fascination with the possibility that extraterrestrials were involved in the great extinctions that had happened millions of years ago.

Plot 
On a beach in Côte d'Ivoire, a metallic artifact with inscriptions is discovered by Solomon Merkmallen, a biology professor. When he takes it to his office and places it together with a similar artifact, the two suddenly fuse and fly across the room, becoming embedded in a Bible. Merkmallen then travels to the U.S. to meet with Steven Sandoz, an American University biologist who has a third artifact. However, he is murdered by a man posing as Sandoz; when the real Sandoz finds the body, he flees.

Assistant Director Walter Skinner assigns Agents Fox Mulder and Dana Scully to investigate Sandoz's disappearance, giving them a rubbing of Merkmallen's artifact. Mulder tells Skinner that both Merkmallen and Sandoz espoused panspermia, a theory suggesting an extraterrestrial origin to life on Earth. Mulder begins suffering from a headache and is unable to hear Scully speak, a condition seemingly caused by the rubbing. At the university, the agents meet Dr. Barnes—the man who posed as Sandoz—who professes disbelief in his theories. Mulder's condition worsens, but he refuses to go to the hospital and, due to seeming telepathic abilities, realizes that Barnes murdered Merkmallen. Later, in Mulder's office, Chuck Burks tells them that the symbols on the artifact are from Navajo and that they were fake.

In Sandoz's apartment, Mulder and Scully find a picture of him with Albert Hosteen; they also find Merkmallen's dismembered body in a trash bag. The agents report to Skinner, with Mulder believing that Sandoz is being framed and that the artifact emits galactic radiation. He also seems to know that someone else is involved on the case, but Skinner remains silent. However, after the agents leave, Skinner hands a video tape of their conversation to Alex Krycek, who later provides it to Barnes. Scully travels to New Mexico and discovers that Hosteen is dying of cancer; Scully runs into Sandoz and corners him. Sandoz claims that Albert was helping him translate the artifacts, which had included passages from the Bible. Meanwhile, Mulder goes to the university to tail Barnes, but is overcome by his headache and passes out in the stairwell.

Scully contacts Mulder, who is now resting at home. He believes that the artifact proves that humanity was created by aliens. Diana Fowley, who is with Mulder, contacts the Smoking Man. A healing ceremony is held for Albert, but Scully is forced to leave when Skinner contacts her, telling her Mulder has been hospitalized in critical condition. Mulder is being held in a padded cell and is displaying abnormal brain activity. After learning that Skinner knows about their earlier conversation with Burks, Scully denounces both him and Fowley before she leaves. She is about to find a surveillance camera in the X-Files office when she is called by Sandoz, who tells her that the artifact contains information on human genetics. Sandoz is killed by Krycek shortly afterwards. Scully then heads to Côte d'Ivoire, where she discovers that the artifact is part of a large spacecraft partially buried in the beach.

Production 

"Biogenesis" started a new branch of the show's mythology, questioning the origin of human life. Series creator Chris Carter, who had been interested in the possibility of extraterrestrial involvement in great extinctions that had happened millions of years ago, claimed that early in the show he had met with a man who was one of the people responsible for leading the project of mapping the human genome, which interested him enough to tie it into the show's alien mythology. The scientific basis for extraterrestrials was an attempt by the writers to have Mulder and Scully's divergent beliefs come together, which was furthered in the later seasons of the show. Frank Spotnitz claimed that the ideas used in this episode had been discussed between him and Carter for a few years and had become easier to bring up after wrapping up much of the conspiracy in the sixth-season episodes "Two Fathers" and "One Son". Carter eventually developed the script in Vancouver, British Columbia, Canada while working on the pilot for his series Harsh Realm and sent copies to the production crew via fax.

Professor Solomon Merkmallen was played by Michael Chinyamurindi, who had immigrated to the United States ten years prior and had previously auditioned for the fourth-season episode "Teliko" in season four. A number of African immigrants were used to play the fishermen that Scully meets along the African coast. Chinyamurindi’s Anglophone accent and the subtitles stating that the characters in the opening scenes are speaking Swahili is a significant error: The Ivory Coast, a Francophone country, is on the other side of the African continent from both Swahili speakers and Chinyamurindi’s Zimbabwean accent. The University scenes were shot at UCLA, whereas the African coastline scenes were filmed at Leo Carrillo State Park. Weather conditions meant that the crew only had approximately 45 minutes per day to film at the latter location. The spacecraft was created digitally and the effect ended up costing approximately $150,000. The extraterrestrial writing on the artifacts was based on the 1965 Kecksburg UFO Incident, when local residents found a large object in the woods shaped like an acorn bearing writing resembling Egyptian hieroglyphs. Hosteen Etsity, who previously assisted with the episode "The Blessing Way" oversaw the use and implementation of Navajo symbols in this episode.

A large portion of the episode was based on the ancient astronaut theory, which proposes that intelligent extraterrestrial beings have visited Earth in antiquity or prehistory and made contact with humans. Frank Spotnitz later remarked that he was astounded at how little negative fan mail the show received, despite the fact that the "Biogenesis"/"The Sixth Extinction"/"Amor Fati" story arc heavily hinted that aliens were the originators of the notion of God and religion. He credited the manner in which the show handled this delicate subject, saying, "Often in the past, we've done stuff where I was sure we would get angry letters. But we rarely do. And the reason is because of the way we handle things. In 'Amor Fati' we treated the religious side with respect." The ancient astronaut themes were later revisited in the two season nine episodes "Provenance" and "Providence."

Reception 
"Biogenesis" first aired in the United States on May 16, 1999. This episode earned a Nielsen rating of 9.4, with a 14 share, meaning that roughly 9.4 percent of all television-equipped households, and 14 percent of households watching television, were tuned in to the episode. It was viewed by 15.86 million viewers. The episode aired in the United Kingdom on Sky1 on July 25, 1999, and received 0.55 million viewers and was the eighth most watched episode that week. Fox promoted the episode with the tagline "You've heard every theory about how man evolved... except for one." The episode was later included on The X-Files Mythology, Volume 3 – Colonization, a DVD collection that contains episodes involved with the alien Colonist's plans to take over the earth.

Tom Kessenich, in his book Examination: An Unauthorized Look at Seasons 6–9 of the X-Files gave the episode a positive review, writing "'Biogenesis' gave us a Mulder gone mad, duplicitous allies and enemies, a rising body count, and Scully on the brink of an amazing discovery. It was pure X-Files and a terrific conclusion to a standout sixth season." Den of Geek writer Nina Sordi ranked "Biogenesis," along with "The Sixth Extinction" and "The Sixth Extinction II: Amor Fati," as the fifth best episode of the series, writing, "it is evident that as [The X-Files] progressed, the episodes surrounding those storylines and the breaking points Mulder and Scully endured push them further and further towards total, irreversible defeat. This is especially poignant when viewing this anxiety inducing trio of episodes." Monica S. Kuebler from Exclaim magazine called "Biogenesis", along with "The Sixth Extinction" and "Amor Fati", one of the "best" episodes during the show's "colonization" phase. Michigan Daily reviewer Melissa Runstrom said "Biogenesis," along with "One Son" and "Two Fathers," were the highlights of the sixth season.

Zack Handlen awarded the episode a "B" and called it "crazy enough at the end that, if nothing else, I really want to know what happens next". He enjoyed the basic premise, involving the idea that aliens were active in the development of humanity—comparing it to Stanley Kubrick’s film 2001: A Space Odyssey and Ridley Scott’s movie Prometheus. However, Handlen, since he was reviewing the series retrospectively, was slightly disappointed that the plot was dropped in subsequent season. In the end, he noted that the entry was "ambitious, but it doesn’t exactly make sense, which is pretty much where [The X-Files mythology] is at now."

Other reviews were more critical. Robert Shearman and Lars Pearson, in their book Wanting to Believe: A Critical Guide to The X-Files, Millennium & The Lone Gunmen, rated the episode two stars out of five. The two heavily criticized the episode for recycling story lines, writing, "With the Syndicate destroyed, this episode was widely touted as the beginning of a fresh new mythology for the show. So why does watching it give such a strong sense of déjà vu?" Paula Vitaris from Cinefantastique gave the episode a largely negative review and awarded it one-and-a-half stars out of four. Vitaris summarized the episode as "if someone took the script to 'Anasazi'—one of the best X-Files episodes ever—changed the plot a bit, and then stripped it of virtually all human interest."

Footnotes

Bibliography

External links

 

1999 American television episodes
Television episodes written by Chris Carter
Television episodes set in Ivory Coast
Television episodes set in Maryland
Television episodes set in New Mexico
The X-Files (season 6) episodes